James Leary may refer to:

James Leary (musician) (born 1946), American double bass player and arranger/composer
James C. Leary (born 1973), American actor
James P. Leary, American folklorist
James Leary, character in Vanishing on 7th Street